Porompat (Meitei pronunciation: /pō-rōm-pāt/) is a census town in Imphal East district in the Indian state of Manipur.

Demographics
 India census, Porompat had a population of 5163. Males constitute 49% of the population and females 51%. Porompat has an average literacy rate of 71%, higher than the national average of 59.5%: male literacy is 80%, and female literacy is 61%. In Porompat, 12% of the population is under 6 years of age.

References

Cities and towns in Imphal East district
Imphal East district